Achávalite a selenide mineral that is a member of the nickeline group. It has only been found in a single Argentinian mine system, being first discovered in 1939 in a selenide deposit. The type locality is Cacheuta mine, Sierra de Cacheuta, Mendoza, Argentina.

See also
 List of minerals

References

Selenide minerals
Hexagonal minerals
Minerals in space group 194